Renegade is a studio album by American musician Charlie Daniels. It was released in 1991 via Epic Records. The album peaked at number 25 on the Billboard Top Country Albums chart.

"Layla" is a cover by Derek and the Dominos, from their 1970 album, Layla and Other Assorted Love Songs.

"Fathers and Sons" is a cover of a Waylon Jennings song called "Between Fathers and Sons" from his 1987 album, Hangin' Tough.

Track listing
"Renegade" (Charlie Daniels, Taz DiGregorio, Charlie Hayward, Jack Gavin, Bruce Ray Brown) – 3:57
"Talk to Me Fiddle" (Daniels, DiGregorio, Hayward, Gavin, Brown) – 3:34
"Little Folks" (Daniels) – 3:14
"Honky Tonk Life" (Daniels) – 3:23
"Layla" (Eric Clapton, Jim Gordon) – 3:02
"The Twang Factor" (Stephen Allen Davis) – 3:22
"Fathers and Sons" (John Barlow Jarvis, Gary Nicholson) – 3:48
"What My Baby Sees in Me" (Jerry Laseter, James Dean Hicks, Mark Alan Springer) – 3:06
"Willie Jones" (Daniels) – 3:15
"Let Freedom Ring" (Daniels, DiGregorio, Hayward, Gavin, Brown) – 5:01

Personnel
 Charlie Daniels - banjo, fiddle, mandolin, guitar, lead vocals
 Taz DiGregorio - keyboards
 Charlie Hayward - bass guitar
 Jack Gavin - drums, percussion
 Bruce Ray Brown - guitar, harmonica, background vocals
 Carolyn Corlew - background vocals
 Fisk University Jubilee Singers - background vocals
 Bobby Jones - background vocals
 New Life Community Choir - background vocals
 James Stroud - background vocals

Chart performance

References

1991 albums
Charlie Daniels albums
Epic Records albums
Albums produced by James Stroud